Glowsticks For Clubbing Baby Seals is an album released by Orlando group Indorphine. Indorphine also included an instrumental for this album titled 'Blue Eskimo'. The blue title is a re-occurring theme with the band for their instrumentals.

Track listing

Credits

 Jimmy Grant - Vocals
 Everett Sailor - Drums
 Adam Phillips - Guitar
 Buddy Fischel - Guitar
 Tanner Owings - Bass

References
CD Universe
Official Myspace
Official Last.fm

2006 albums
Indorphine albums